James Anderson (born 3 November 1980) is a British actor.

Born in the Surrey village of Thursley, Anderson graduated with first class honours from Warwick University and went on to train at the Actors Studio (MFA) in New York City. He has since had roles across TV, stage and film. 

He is best known for playing Oliver Valentine on the BBC medical drama Holby City between 2009-2021.

For his debut film he was recipient of the Gold Hugo Award (2006), gaining eligibility for an Academy Award (2008).

Personal life 
James is married with two children and lives in Sussex.

Selected filmography
Endeavour (2023)
Holby City (2009–13, 2014, 2015-18, 2021)
Agatha Raisin (2020) 
Father Brown (2020)
Agatha Christie's Poirot (2013)
Rock Rivals (2007)
Forgetting Betty (2006)

References

External links
 

English male film actors
1980 births
Living people
Male actors from Surrey
Male actors from London